Jeh Airport  is a public use airstrip at Jeh on Ailinglaplap Atoll, Marshall Islands. This airstrip is assigned the location identifier JEJ by the IATA.

Facilities 
Jeh Airport has one runway measuring 3,800 ft (1,158 m).

Airlines and destinations

References 

Airports in the Marshall Islands